The following is a list of massacres that have occurred against Hazara people, who are overwhelmingly Twelver Shia Muslims and make up the third largest ethnic group in Afghanistan:

See also
List of massacres in Afghanistan

References

Afghanistan
Massacres

Masscres